Switzerland competed at the 2015 World Aquatics Championships in Kazan, Russia from 24 July to 9 August 2015.

Diving

Swiss divers qualified for the individual spots at the World Championships.

Men

Women

Mixed

Swimming

Swiss swimmers have achieved qualifying standards in the following events (up to a maximum of 2 swimmers in each event at the A-standard entry time, and 1 at the B-standard):

Men

Women

Mixed

Synchronized swimming

Switzerland fielded a full team of twelve synchronized swimmers to compete in each of the following events.

References

External links
Swiss Swimming Federation 

Nations at the 2015 World Aquatics Championships
2015 in Swiss sport
Switzerland at the World Aquatics Championships